Parupalli (Telugu: పారుపల్లి) is an Indian surname. Notable people with the surname include:

Parupalli Satyanarayana, Indian theatre actor and singer, appeared in 1935 film Sri Krishna Leelalu
Parupalli Ramakrishnayya Pantulu, guruji of M. Balamuralikrishna
Parupalli Kashyap, Indian badminton player

Indian surnames